The men's 400m freestyle events at the 2020 World Para Swimming European Championships were held at the Penteada Olympic Pools Complex.

Medalists

Results

S6

S7
Final

S8
Final

S9

S10
Final

S11

S13

References

2020 World Para Swimming European Championships